The Place Louise-Catherine-Breslau-et-Madeleine-Zillhardt is situated in the 6th arrondissement of Paris, on a crowdy crossroad between the districts of La Monnaie and Saint-Germain-des-Prés.

History 

The place is named in memory of German painter Louise Catherine Breslau and French writer Madeleine Zillhardt, by vote of the Council of Paris.

Features 
Parisian famous Café de Buci is situated on the square.

References

Squares in Paris
Buildings and structures in the 6th arrondissement of Paris
Tourist attractions in Paris